Vicente González (?  - ?) was governor of Florida between November 22, 1577, and 1578. He was also governor of Santa Elena, la Florida, from, at least, 1577 to 1580.

Vicente González was appointment lieutenant of Pedro Menéndez de Márquez in Santa Elena, together to Captain Tomás Bernaldo de Quirós, in 1577, serving in this charge until 1580. On November 22, 1577, González was appointment governor of Florida,  holding office until 1578. In 1586 Gonzalez led a mission send for Menéndez de Márquez to a legendary strait located "beyond" Florida, where several villages were established, of which Menendez de Marquez wanted to learn. During his trip, Gonzalez meet a local cacique who confirmed him the existence of the strait. In October 1586, Gonzalez told the Council of the Indies that near St. Augustine, Florida was a port next to a fertile land with gold and diamond mines, which was densely populated by indigenous. The Council decided that this land should be studied and Spanish shipwreck victims to settle there. In the 1580s Vicente González led several voyages into the Chesapeake Bay in search of English settlements in the area.

References

Royal Governors of La Florida
16th-century births
Year of death unknown